Leandro Putaro (born 7 January 1997) is a German professional footballer who plays as a striker for VfL Osnabrück.

Club career

VfL Wolfsburg
Putaro is a youth exponent from VfL Wolfsburg. He made his Bundesliga debut on 6 February 2016 against Schalke 04. He substituted Nicklas Bendtner after 81 minutes in a 3–0 away loss.

Arminia Bielefeld
For the 2016–17 season Putaro went on loan to 2. Bundesliga side Arminia Bielefeld.

In June 2017, the deal was made permanent and Putaro signed on three-year deal with Bielefeld.

Eintracht Braunschweig
On 17 August 2018, Putaro joined Eintracht Braunschweig on loan until the end of 2018–19 season.

SC Verl
Putaro moved to 3. Liga club SC Verl on 2 February 2021, a day after having been released from his contract by Eintracht Braunschweig.

International career
Putaro was born in Germany and is of Italian descent. Putaro is a German youth international at various levels.

Career statistics

References

External links

1997 births
Living people
Sportspeople from Göttingen
German sportspeople of Italian descent
German footballers
Association football forwards
Germany youth international footballers
Bundesliga players
2. Bundesliga players
3. Liga players
VfL Wolfsburg players
Arminia Bielefeld players
Eintracht Braunschweig players
SC Verl players
VfL Osnabrück players